The 3rd APAN Star Awards was held on November 15, 2014 at the Hall of Jeongsimhwa International Cultural Center, Chungnam National University in Daejeon. T-ara's Park So-yeon and Kim Sung-joo were the host of the award ceremony.  First held in 2012, the annual awards ceremony recognizes the excellence in South Korea's television. The nominees were chosen from 87 Korean dramas that aired from November 1, 2013 to September 2014.

Nominations and winners

Winners are listed first, highlighted in boldface, and indicated with a dagger.

References

External links
 

APAN
APAN Star Awards
APAN Star Awards